The 2003 UC Davis football team represented the University of California, Davis as an independent during the 2003 NCAA Division II football season. Led by 11th-year head coach Bob Biggs, UC Davis compiled a record of 6–4. 2003 was the 34th consecutive winning season for the Aggies, but was the first since 1995 that they failed to qualify for the postseason. The team outscored their opponents 295 to 184 for the season. The Aggies played home games at Toomey Field in Davis, California.

This was the final season that UC Davis competed at the NCAA Division II level as they moved up to NCAA Division I-AA in 2004 as a charter member of the Great West Football Conference (GWFC).

Schedule

NFL Draft
The following UC Davis Aggies players were selected in the 2004 NFL Draft.

References

UC Davis
UC Davis Aggies football seasons
UC Davis Aggies football